Delta Persei (Delta Per, δ Persei, δ Per) is a double star in the northern constellation of Perseus. It has an apparent visual magnitude of 3.01, making it readily visible with the naked eye.

The spectrum of this star matches a stellar classification of B5 III, which indicates it is a giant star that has evolved away from the main sequence after exhausting the hydrogen at its core. It has about seven times the Sun's mass and has an estimated age of 6.8 million years. The effective temperature of the outer envelope is 14,890 K, with the energy being emitted at this temperature giving it the blue-white hue that is a characteristic of a B-type star. It is rotating rapidly with a projected rotational velocity of 190 km s−1, which gives a lower bound for the actual azimuthal velocity along the star's equator.

This is most probably a binary star and may be a triple star system. It has an optical companion with an apparent magnitude of +6.17 at an angular separation of 0.330 arcseconds and a position angle of 221°, but it is uncertain whether this is an optical double star or a gravitationally bound companion. The star has also been categorized as a spectroscopic binary, indicating that it has an orbiting companion that has not been separately resolved with a telescope. Finally, this star may be a member of the Melotte 20 open cluster, which would make it the second-brightest member after Mirfak.

Observation with the IRAS shows an extended, ring-like feature that may be a bow wave driven by radiation pressure from the star, rather than a bubble being generated by the stellar wind. This feature has an angular size of 15 × 25 arcminutes and a peak temperature of 38 K. It has an estimated peculiar velocity of more than 30 km s−1, making it a runaway star.

Name and etymology
This star, together with ψ Per, σ Per, α Per, γ Per and η Per, has been called the Segment of Perseus.  

References

External links
 Al-Thurayya

B-type giants
Binary stars
Runaway stars
Alpha Persei Cluster

Perseus (constellation)
Persei, Delta
BD+47 0876
Persei, 39
022928
017358
1122